Balloo is a small village and townland near Killinchy in County Down, Northern Ireland. It is 5 miles south of Comber on the A22 road between Belfast and Downpatrick. It is situated in the townland of the same name, the civil parish of Killinchy and the historic barony of Dufferin. It lies within the Ards and North Down Borough. It had a population of 189 people (83 households) in the 2011 Census. (2001 Census: 159 people)

Places of interest 
Originally a coaching house dating back to the late 17th century, Balloo House is a pub and restaurant, with stone floors and working Aga dominating the historic kitchen bar. It was once a large farmhouse, bought by the McConnell family in 1893, and has been a licensed premises ever since. In January 2008, Balloo House was announced as one of the Bridgestone Guide's top 100 restaurants in Ireland.

People
John Jordan (1852–1925), a British diplomat, was born in Upper Balloo.

See also 
List of towns and villages in Northern Ireland
List of townlands in County Down

References 

Villages in County Down
Townlands of County Down
Civil parish of Killinchy